Hervé Descottes is a French lighting designer, business owner and author. He established the lighting design firm L'Observatoire International in New York City in 1993 after eight years of design practice in Paris, France. Descottes personally creates the lighting concepts for all projects designed by L'Observatoire International, and oversees project development through project completion. He is the author of Ultimate Lighting Design (teNeues, 2005) and co-authored Architectural Lighting, Designing with Light and Space (Princeton Architectural Press, 2011) with Cecilia E. Ramos.  Mr. Descottes has been recognized numerous times by the lighting design and architectural community. He has received awards from the International Association of Lighting Designers, the Illuminating Engineering Society and the New York City Illuminating Engineering Society, the American Institute of Architects, the American Society of Landscape Architects, D&ADAD, the Municipal Art Society of New York City, and the GE Corporation. In 2008, Descottes was named Chevalier of the Order of Arts and Letters by the French Minister of Culture for his work in lighting design.

A comprehensive list of projects and awards is at the L'Observatoire International article.

Selected projects 

National Museum of Qatar, Qatar: designed by Ateliers Jean Nouvel
Hudson Yards Masterplan, Towers 10, 15, 30, 35, 50, The Vessel: designed by KPF, DS+R, Heatherwick Studio 
Musée du Louvre Pyramid Renovation: designed by Agence Search
LVMH Global Concepts (Louis Vuitton, Fendi, Dior, Dior Parfums): for LVMH 
LVMH brand stores, worldwide various architects plus for LVMH
Facebook Menlo Park: designed by: Gehry Partners
Metropolitan Museum of Art façade and plaza, NYC: designed by Olin Partnership
Aspen Art Museum, Aspen, CO: designed by Shigeru Ban Architects
Kennedy Center for the Performing Arts expansion, Washington, D.C.: designed by Steven Holl Architects
Fondation Louis Vuitton, Paris: designed by Gehry Partners
Guggenheim Abu Dhabi: designed by Gehry Partners
Chanel, Los Angeles, London: designed by Peter Marino Architect
Van Cleef & Arpels Flagships, Paris, HK, NY Cdesigned by Agence Jouin Manku
Van Cleef & Arpels Exhibition, Tokyo, NYC, Paris, Shanghai: designed by Agence Jouin Manku
Lincoln Center Redevelopment, NYC: designed by Diller, Scofidio + Renfro, FX Fowle
Museum of the Moving Image, NYC: designed by Leeser Architecture
Cité du Surf et de l’Océan, Biarrtiz: designed by Steven Holl Architects
The Highline, NYC: designed by Field Operations, DS+R
The Art Gallery of Ontario, Toronto: designed by Gehry Partners
Virginia Museum of Fine Arts, Richmond, VA: designed by Rick Mather + SMBW
Walt Disney Concert Hall, Los Angeles: designed by Gehry Partners
Columbus Circle Redevelopment, NYC: designed by Olin Partnership
Leeum Samsung Museum of Art, Seoul: designed by Ateliers Jean Nouvel, OMA, Mario Botta

Lectures 

Friends of ESDA of the Metropolitan Museum of Art, New York, USA 2019
Hervé Descottes in Conversation with Cindy Allen, Interior Design Innovation, New York, USA 2019
Belysnings, Stockholm, Sweden 2018
Designing with Light, Chicago Architecture Biennal Symposium, Chicago, USA 2017
Columbia CORE I Series, New York, USA 2016
Foro Lighting en Site IES, Mexico 2015
University Penn Design, Philadelphia, PA, USA 2015
Using Light as Infrastructure, Chester City UK 2014
Ubuntu: Design Symposium, Sangmyung University, Seoul, Korea 2011
OHNY, Friends of the High Line, New York, USA 2010
Light and Theater, New York, NY, USA 2008
Art, Architecture and Light, Athens, Greece, 2008
Making Light, IES Mexico, Mexico City, Mexico, 2008
Evocative Luminance, IES NY, New York, USA 2007
Rediscovering Columbus, New York, USA 2007
UW School of Architecture, University of Waterloo, Canada, 2006
Cooper Union School of Architecture, New York, USA 2006
Lighting Design Talk, Cedar Lake Theater, New York, USA 2006
Center of Mediterranean Architecture, Chania Crete, Greece, 2004
Hommages a James Turrell, Institute Franco-Portugais, Lisbon, 2003

Bibliography 

 Ultimate Lighting Design (teNeues, 2005)
 Architectural Lighting, Designing with Light and Space co-authored with Cecilia E. Ramos (Princeton Architectural Press, 2011)

External links
 L'Observatoire International website 
 December 2011 interview
 New York Daily News article about Descottes

References

Year of birth missing (living people)
Living people
French designers
Lighting designers
Architectural lighting design